The Swindon Town reserve team previously played in the Totesport.com Combination League. They also participate in the Wiltshire Premier Shield each season. The Swindon Town Development side play their home games at The County Ground, Swindon. In previous seasons the team has also played at Hunts Copse, the home of Swindon Supermarine.

Under 18 squad

Honours
Swindon Town's Youth Team were FA Youth Cup finalists in 1964, where they were beaten over two legs by a Manchester United side containing George Best. The team did not appear in the final stages of the competition again until 2004 where they lost 3–0 to Chesterfield in the Quarter-final.

Managed by Paul Bodin, the Youth team reached the Quarter-finals of the FA Youth Cup again in 2007 before being knocked out of the competition by Newcastle.

During the 2000s Swindon Town's juniors have enjoyed a degree of success at the Milk Cup tournament.

 Player of the Tournament Award - Leigh Mills (2003)
 Adidas Golden Boot Award - Lukas Jutkiewicz (2004)
 Tayto Most Sporting Team Award - Winners (2005)
 Northern Ireland Tourist Board Trophy - Winners (2006)
 Northern Ireland Milk Cup - Winners (2006)
 B.T. Northern Ireland Trophy - Winners (2007)

Achievements (Reserves & Youth Combined)

Cup Honours
Wiltshire Premier Shield - Winners 1927, 1928, 1929, 1930, 1931, 1932, 1933, 1948, 1949, 1951, 1952, 1953, 1954, 1955, 1956, 1958, 1959, 1972, 1974, 1975, 1976, 1977, 1980, 1988, 1990, 1991, 1992, 2010
Puma Youth Alliance Cup - Winners 2005
Milk Cup - Winners of the Junior section 2006
Milk Cup - Winners of the B.T. Northern Ireland Trophy 2007
Football League Youth Alliance - Winners of South West 2009-11

References

Reserves And Youth